The Finn was a sailing event on the Sailing at the 1980 Summer Olympics program in Tallinn, USSR. The Finn dinghy is the men's single-handed, cat-rigged Olympic class for sailing.  Seven races were scheduled; 21 sailors, on 21 boats, from 21 nations competed.

Final results 

DNF = Did Not Finish, DNS= Did Not Start, DSQ = Disqualified, PMS = Premature Start, YMP = Yacht Materially Prejudiced 
 = Male,  = Female

Daily standings

Notes

References 
 
 
 
 

Finn
Finn competitions